Ljubomir Ristovski (born 29 November 1969) is a Serbian football manager and former player.

Playing career
Ristovski played for Borac Čačak in the First League of FR Yugoslavia, before moving to Portugal in the summer of 1995. He stayed there until the end of his career, playing with União da Madeira, Penafiel, and Nacional da Madeira.

Managerial career
After hanging up his boots, Ristovski began his managerial career at Radnički Sombor in 2006. He also served as manager of Proleter Novi Sad, before signing with Serbian SuperLiga club Spartak Subotica in December 2010. In June 2011, Ristovski took charge of Vojvodina, but left two months later. In September 2011, Ristovski signed with Novi Pazar, before being replaced by Dragoljub Bekvalac in April 2012.

References

External links
 
 

Association football midfielders
C.D. Nacional players
C.F. União players
Expatriate football managers in Angola
Expatriate football managers in Thailand
Expatriate footballers in Portugal
F.C. Penafiel players
FK Borac Čačak players
FK Donji Srem managers
FK Inđija managers
FK Novi Pazar managers
FK Proleter Novi Sad managers
FK Smederevo managers
FK Spartak Subotica managers
FK Vojvodina managers
Kabuscorp S.C.P. managers
Liga Portugal 2 players
RFK Novi Sad 1921 players
Serbia and Montenegro expatriate footballers
Serbia and Montenegro footballers
Serbian expatriate football managers
Serbian expatriate sportspeople in Angola
Serbian expatriate sportspeople in Thailand
Serbian football managers
Serbian footballers
Serbian SuperLiga managers
Serbs of Croatia
Sportspeople from Knin
Ljubomir Ristovski
Yugoslav footballers
1969 births
Living people
Serbian expatriate sportspeople in Portugal